Bruges is a commune in the French department of Gironde, region of Nouvelle-Aquitaine (formerly Aquitaine), southwestern 
France.
It is located north of Bordeaux.

Toponymy 
The homography with Bruges (Belgium) is purely coincidental. The place-name comes from Gasconic bruche, with a plural -s meaning "bushes", "scrubs".

Population

Personalities
Anthony Moura-Komenan footballer
Mathieu Valbuena footballer, currently playing for Olympiacos FC

See also
Communes of the Gironde department

References

Communes of Gironde